The Hamptons is a limited run prime-time soap opera which aired during the summer of 1983 (from July 27 through August 24) for 5 episodes on ABC. It was produced by Gloria Monty, the producer credited with turning General Hospital from a low-rated daytime serial to a soap phenomenon. The series is set in Manhattan and the affluent Long Island community referenced in the show's title.

The cast includes actors with previous experience in daytime and prime-time serials: Leigh Taylor-Young (Peyton Place), Michael Goodwin (Another World), John Reilly (As the World Turns, Dallas) Bibi Besch (Secrets of Midland Heights, Somerset, Love Is a Many Splendored Thing), etc.

The series was shot on videotape rather than film, which gave it a look consistent with most daytime soap operas. The focus of the series was on the wealthy Chadway and Duncan-Mortimer families, who co-owned the stylish Duncan-Chadway department stores. The Chadways (Peter, wife Lee, son Brian and daughter Miranda) were positioned as the noble family, while the Duncan-Mortimers (Jay, wife Adrienne, and daughter Tracy) were the schemers. The plots concerned power maneuvers to gain control of the retail corporation, and illicit sexual couplings.

By the final episode, Peter Chadway was accused of murder, Jay Mortimer, who had schemed to seize control of the company, was exposed as having forced his stepdaughter Tracy into an incestuous relationship, and rival businessman Nick Atwater used the vulnerable state of the Chadway marriage to insinuate himself further into Lee's life. The cliffhangers were left unresolved.

It was hoped if that if ratings were strong, the series would return to the ABC schedule at some point, but no further episodes were produced. However, years later, cast members Taylor-Young and Sheffer reunited for the 1997 film Bliss.

Cast
Peter Chadway ... Michael Goodwin
Lee Chadway ... Leigh Taylor-Young
Brian Chadway ... Craig Sheffer
Miranda Chadway ... Martha Byrne 
Jay Mortimer ... John Reilly
Adrienne Duncan-Mortimer ... Bibi Besch
Tracy Mortimer ... Holly Roberts
Cheryl Ashcroft ... Kate Dezina
David Landau ... Philip Casnoff
Nick Atwater ... Daniel Pilon
Karen Harper ... Kathleen Buse
Penny Drake ... Jada Rowland
Ada ... Fran Carlon
Clitty Chuffwinkle ... Vergiana Felcher

References

Notes

Sources 
 Bruce B. Morris, Prime Time Network Serials: Episode Guides, Casts and Credits for 37 Continuing Television Dramas, 1964-1993, McFarland and Company, 1997.

External links

1983 American television series debuts
1983 American television series endings
American television soap operas
American primetime television soap operas
American Broadcasting Company original programming
English-language television shows